Jakob Ingebrigtsen (born 19 September 2000) is a Norwegian middle- and long-distance runner. He won the gold medal in the 1500 metres at the 2020 Tokyo Olympics, setting an Olympic and European record. At the 2022 World Athletics Championships, Ingebrigtsen took silver in the 1500 m and a gold for the 5000 metres. He is a four-time European champion, winning the 1500 m/5000 m double in 2018 and 2022. His 1500 m victory in 2018 achieved at the age of 17 made him the second youngest ever individual senior European track and field champion, while his double was the first in history. Indoors, he is 2022 World Indoor Championship 1500 m silver medallist and a six-time European Indoor Championships medallist in the 1500/3000 metres events, including five golds and the 'double-double' from 2021 and 2023 (his double in 2021 was the first such ever by a male athlete). Ingebrigtsen won six successive titles at the European Cross Country Championships. He is the current world indoor record holder for the 1500 m, which he set on 17 February 2022 in Liévin, France.

At age 16, Ingebrigtsen became the youngest man in history to run a mile in less than four minutes, and the same year, he broke the European Under-20 record in the 3000 metres steeplechase. As a junior, he claimed four medals altogether at the 2017 European U20 Championships and 2018 World U20 Championships. In October 2019, he was the youngest pacemaker in the successful unofficial sub-2 hour marathon attempt by Eliud Kipchoge. Ingebrigtsen holds European records in the 1500 m, 2000 m and 5000 m, which he set in August 2020, June 2020 and June 2021 respectively. As of December 2022, he was the 8th, 6th, 12th and 15th fastest man over the 1500 m, 2000 m, 3000 m and 5000 m, respectively. He also holds the distinction of being one of only two men to run a sub-3:30 1500 m, sub-7:30 3000 m and a sub-12:50 5000 m along with the 3000 m and two mile world record holder Daniel Komen. Ingebrigtsen was the 2022 Diamond League 1500 m champion.

His older brothers Henrik and Filip are also middle-distance runners who compete internationally. They were trained by their father Gjert Ingebrigtsen until 2022.

Career

2017

On 27 May, still 16 year old, Ingebrigtsen became the youngest athlete in history to run the one-mile distance in less than 4 minutes, when he finished in 11th place in a Diamond League race at the Hayward Field in Eugene, US. On 15 June, he ran almost two seconds faster, when he won the race with a time of 3:56.29 at the Bislett Games in Oslo, Norway.

On 8 July, in his first attempt at the distance, he beat the European Under-20 record in the 3000 metres steeplechase at the Guldensporenmeeting in Kortrijk, Belgium with the of time 8:26.81.

2018: European 1500 m and 5000 m champion at age 17
On 26 May, at age 17, Ingebrigtsen ran a 3:52.28 mile in the Prefontaine Classic's Bowerman Mile for fourth place. It is the fastest mile run by a 17-year-old.

2019
On 5 July, he set a new personal best and a U20 European Record in the 1500 m when he ran 3:30.16 at the Lausanne Diamond League for second position.

On 20 July at the London Diamond League, he set a new national record and U20 European Record at the 5000 m with 13:02.03, finishing second.

As of 6 October 2019 Jakob was ranked as the second best 1500 m runner in the world, only behind Timothy Cheruiyot.

Making his debut at the distance, he broke Sondre Nordstad Moen’s Norwegian 10 km record at the Hytteplanmila in Hole, Norway on 19 October, with victory in 27:54. Not only was Jakob's time a national record, it was also the fastest time by a European in 2019 as well as being a European U20 10 km best.

2020: First European record (1500 m)
On 14 August at the Monaco Diamond League, Ingebrigtsen went for the first time under 3:30 barrier in the 1500 m and broke Mo Farah's 7-year-old European record (3:28.81) with a time of 3:28.68.

2021: Tokyo Olympic 1500 m champion
On 10 June 2021 at the Diamond League in Florence, Italy, he set a new European record in the 5000 m with his time of 12:48.45, in a race where a half-dozen competitors bested a time of 12:55.

At the delayed 2020 Tokyo Olympics, Ingebrigtsen set an Olympic and European record at 3 minutes 28.32 seconds to secure gold in the 1500-meter final, after eclipsing the previous record of 3:31:65 held by the Kenyan Abel Kipsang. He became the second youngest winner in the event.  On the final bend Ingebrigtsen overtook for the first time Timothy Cheruiyot, who won the silver medal.Prior to the event, Ingebrigtsen had lost twelve straight 1500m / mile races to his Kenyan rival.

At the season-ending Diamond League finale at the Zurich Weltklasse meet, Ingebrigtsen placed second to Cheruiyot, who edged him out over the final sprint.

2022: World indoor 1500 m record and World 5000 m title
On 17 February 2022, Ingebrigtsen set his first senior world record, clocking 3:30.60 for the indoor 1500 m at the Meeting Hauts-de-France Pas-de-Calais in Liévin. He broke Samuel Tefera’s 3-year-old record by 0.44 seconds.

At about a month later at the 2022 World Indoor Championships held in Belgrade, Ingebrigtsen was beaten in the event by Tefera (3:32.77, CR), however, and placed second in a time of 3:33.02. He tested positive for COVID-19 the following day though.

He won the gold medal at the 5000 metres event at the 2022 World Athletics Championships in Eugene, Oregon in a time of 13:09:24. Ingebrigtsen became the first male runner not born in Africa to win an Olympic or World Championships gold at the 5000 m in 30 years, going back to Dieter Baumann in the 1992 Barcelona Olympics.

At the season-ending Zürich Diamond League final, he defeated Timothy Cheruiyot in the 1500 m to take his first Diamond Trophy. The victory brought his lifetime head-to-head with Cheruiyot to 7–13.

2023–present
In March at the European Indoor Championships held in Istanbul, Ingebrigtsen secured the 1500 m/3000 m 'double-double', winning both events for the second time. He set a championship record of 3:33.95 at the shorter distance and broke the Norwegian record at the longer event with a time of 7:40.32.

Personal life
Jakob Ingebrigtsen is a star in a Norwegian reality show called Team Ingebrigtsen, which revolves around him and his brothers and shows the trials and tribulations that come in middle-distance running.

Achievements

All information from World Athletics profile.

Personal bests

International competitions

Circuit wins and titles
 Diamond League 1500 m champion:  2022
 2020 (1): Brussels Memorial Van Damme (1500m)
 2021 [4]: Gateshead British Grand Prix (1500m), Florence Golden Gala (5000m), Eugene Prefontaine Classic (One mile), Lausanne Athletissima (3000m)
 2022 [4]: Eugene (One mile, WL), Oslo Bislett Games (One mile, WL  ), Lausanne (1500m, WL), Zürich Weltklasse (1500m, WL)

National championships

References

External links

 
 
 
 
 

2000 births
Living people
People from Sandnes
Norwegian male middle-distance runners
Norwegian male steeplechase runners
World Athletics Championships athletes for Norway
European Athletics Rising Star of the Year winners
European Athletics Championships winners
Ingebrigtsen family
Norwegian Athletics Championships winners
European Athletics Indoor Championships winners
Athletes (track and field) at the 2020 Summer Olympics
Olympic athletes of Norway
Medalists at the 2020 Summer Olympics
Olympic gold medalists for Norway
Olympic gold medalists in athletics (track and field)
World Athletics Indoor Championships medalists
Sportspeople from Rogaland
21st-century Norwegian people
World Athletics Championships winners